George Lawson Kelly (29 June 1933 – 26 October 1998) was a Scottish footballer, who played in the Football League for Cardiff City, Stockport County and Stoke City.

Career
Kelly started his career at his home town side Aberdeen before joining Stoke City in 1955. Kelly had a relatively short spell at the Victoria Ground but he managed to get a fine goal per game ratio of 35 goals in 67 games in the Second Division. He later joined Cardiff City but after the club made a poor start to the 1958–59 season, he lost his place in the side to Derek Tapscott and left to join Stockport County at the end of the season. After he retired from football, Kelly started playing tennis with Johnny King and the pair almost made the 1970 Wimbledon Championships.

Career statistics
Source:

References

External links
 

Footballers from Aberdeen
Scottish footballers
Stoke City F.C. players
Cardiff City F.C. players
Stockport County F.C. players
Aberdeen F.C. players
English Football League players
1933 births
1998 deaths
Association football inside forwards
Scottish Football League players
Banks O' Dee F.C. players
Scottish male tennis players
British male tennis players
Scottish Junior Football Association players